Iceland's first ambassador to Canada was Thor Thors in 1947. Iceland's current ambassador to Canada is Hlynur Guðjónsson.

List of ambassadors

Missions 
 Embassy of Iceland, Ottawa

See also
Canada–Iceland relations
Foreign relations of Iceland
Ambassadors of Iceland

References
List of Icelandic representatives (Icelandic Foreign Ministry website) 

1947 establishments
Main
Canada
Iceland